John Spurling may refer to:
 John Spurling (businessman)
 John Spurling (author)